Farah Shah is a Pakistani television actress and former model. She made her acting debut with a role of Mehru in PTV World's classic series Boota From Toba Tek Singh (1999). Shah's career span for more than 20 years. She worked in various hits of Urdu Television including Landa Bazar (2002), Chashman (2006), Khuda Aur Muhabbat (2011), Numm (2013), Gul-e-Rana (2015), Choti Si Zindagi (2016), Toh Dil Ka Kiya Hua (2017), Suno Chanda (2018).  Her performance as antagonist in Mohabbat Subh Ka Sitara Hai  (2013) and Abro (2016) earned her a nomination for Hum Award in a negative role category. Currently, she is playing a role of Naeema in Hum TV's Suno Chanda 2.

Career 
Entering showbiz while young, Shah became a host on a Lollywood music countdown program Yehi To Hai Lolly-wood. She then pursued acting from Boota from Toba Tek Singh being one of her earliest appearances in drama series. In 2018, she made a cameo appearance in Angeline Malik's social initiative Inkaar Karo for raising awareness about women empowerment in Pakistan.

Television

Awards and nominations

References

External links

1975 births
21st-century Pakistani actresses
Living people
Pakistani female models
Pakistani film actresses
Pakistani television actresses
Pakistani television hosts
Pakistani women television presenters
Punjabi people
Actresses from Lahore